DMZ International Documentary Film Festival, also known as DMZ Docs, is a South Korean film festival for documentary films jointly presented by Gyeonggi Province, Paju and Goyang. Launched in 2009, it is held annually for seven days in September/October less than twenty kilometers from the Korean Demilitarized Zone, and showcases films dealing with "peace, coexistence and reconciliation."

History 
 1st DMZ Docs, October 21-26, 2009
 Films screened: 61 films from 33 countries
 Opening film: The Heart of Jenin, Lior Geller and Marcus Vetter, Germany
 Closing film: 

 2nd DMZ Docs, September 9-13, 2010
 Films screened: 74 films from 35 countries
 Opening film: Peace, Kazuhiro Soda, Japan
 Closing film: 

 3rd DMZ Docs, September 22-28, 2011
 Films screened: 101 films from 30 countries
 Opening film: After the Apocalypse, Antony Butts, Britain
 Closing film: The Tiniest Place, Tatiana Huezo, Mexico

 4th DMZ Docs, September 21-27, 2012
 Films screened: 115 films from 36 countries
 Opening film: Ping Pong, Hugh Hartford, Canada
 Closing film: 

 5th DMZ Docs, October 17-23, 2013
 Films screened: 119 films from 38 countries
 Opening film: Manshin: Ten Thousand Spirits, Park Chan-kyong, South Korea
 Closing film: 

 6th DMZ Docs, September 17-24, 2014
 Films screened: 163 films from 33 countries
 Opening film: Crying Boxers, E Il-ha, South Korea
 Closing film:

 7th DMZ Docs, September 17-24, 2015
 Films screened: 102 films from 43 countries
 Opening film: I Am Sun Mu, Adam Sjöberg, United States
 Closing film:

 8th DMZ Docs, September 22-29, 2016
 Films screened: 116 films from 36 countries
 Opening film: One Warm Spring Day, Chung Su-eun, South Korea
 Closing film:

 9th DMZ Docs, September 21-27, 2017
 Films screened: 114 films from 42 countries
 Opening film: Old Marine Boy, Jin Mo-young, South Korea
 Closing film:
 10th DMZ Docs, September 13-20, 2018
 Films screened: 142 films from 39 countries
 Opening film: Coming to You, Minu, Jee Hye-won, South Korea
 Closing film:

 11th DMZ Docs, September 20-27, 2019
 Films screened: 151 films from 46 countries
 Opening film: Across the Desert, Through the Lake Let's Peace!, Park So-hyun, South Korea
 Closing film:

 12th DMZ Docs, September 17-24, 2020
 Films screened: 122 films from 33 countries
 Opening film: A Long Way to School, Kim Jeong-in, South Korea
 Closing film:

 13th DMZ Docs, September 9-16, 2021
 Films screened: 126 documentaries from 39 countries 
 Opening film: Soup and Ideology, Yang Young-hee, South Korea
 Closing film:

Awards
International Competition: White Goose Award (cash prize of ); Special Jury Award
Korean Competition: Best Korean Documentary Award; Special Jury Award
Audience Award
Youth Competition: Best Youth Documentary Award; Excellence Award

White Goose Award

Special Jury Award

Best Korean Documentary

Audience Award

Best Youth Documentary

Excellence Award in Youth Competition

References

External links
 
 

Documentary film festivals in South Korea
Autumn events in South Korea
2009 establishments in South Korea